Šaumburk is a ruined castle in the Rajnochovice municipality in the Zlín Region of the Czech Republic. It is classified as a cultural monument of the Czech Republic.

It was built by Bishop Bruno von Schauenburg, who named it after his ancestral seat in Lower Saxony.

See also
List of castles in the Zlín Region

References

External links

 Šaumburk at hrady.cz

Castles in the Zlín Region
Ruined castles in the Czech Republic